was a Japanese football club based in Muko, Kyoto, Japan. They played for the last time in Japan Football League for 2015 season.

History
The club was founded in 1986 and started to compete in the Kyoto Prefecture Division 4. They were promoted to Division 1 in 1999 and again to the Kansai Regional League in 2000. They won the League in 2004 and got promoted to the JFL after beating Shizuoka Sangyo University in the play-off. All the players are the employees of Sagawa Printing, a printing company with historical links to the Sagawa Express shipping company.

The name was changed from Sagawa Printing Soccer Club to Sagawa Printing Kyoto Soccer Club in 2014.

The name was changed from Sagawa Printing Kyoto Soccer Club to SP Kyoto Football Club in 2015. The team was disbanded at the end of 2015 season.

Last squad
As of 26 October 2015.

Honours
Kansai Soccer League
Champions (1): 2002
Japan Football League
Clausura Champions (1): 2014

Results in JFL
2003: 15th
2004: 12th
2005: 11th
2006: 15th
2007: 12th
2008: 11th
2009: 9th
2010: 6th
2011: 12th
2012: 7th
2013: 6th
2014: 2nd
2015: 6th

References

External links
  

Association football clubs established in 1986
Sports teams in Kyoto Prefecture
1986 establishments in Japan
Japan Football League clubs
Association football clubs disestablished in 2015
2015 establishments in Japan
Defunct football clubs in Japan
Works association football clubs in Japan